Jolly Roger is the traditional English name for the flags flown to identify a pirate ship preceding or during an attack, during the early 18th century (the later part of the Golden Age of Piracy).

The flag most commonly identified as the Jolly Roger today — the skull and crossbones symbol on a black flag — was used during the 1710s by a number of pirate captains including Black Sam Bellamy, Edward England, and John Taylor. It went on to become the most commonly used pirate flag during the 1720s, although other designs were also in use.

Name 
Use of the term Jolly Roger in reference to pirate flags goes back to at least Charles Johnson's A General History of the Pyrates, published in Britain in 1724.

Johnson specifically cites two pirates as having named their flag "Jolly Roger": Bartholomew Roberts in June 1721 and Francis Spriggs in December 1723.
While Spriggs and Roberts used the same name for their flags, their flag designs were very different, suggesting that already "Jolly Roger" was a generic term for black pirate flags rather than a name for any single specific design. Neither Spriggs' nor Roberts' Jolly Roger consisted of a skull and crossbones.

Richard Hawkins, who was captured by pirates in 1724, reported that the pirates had a black flag bearing the figure of a skeleton stabbing a heart with a spear, which they named "Jolly Roger". This description closely resembles the flags of a number of Golden Age pirates.

It is sometimes claimed that the term derives from "Joli Rouge" ("Pretty Red") in reference to a red flag used by French privateers. This is sometimes attributed to red blood, symbolizing violent pirates, ready to kill.

Another early reference to "Old Roger" is found in a news report in the Weekly Journal or British Gazetteer (London, Saturday, October 19, 1723; Issue LVII, p. 2, col. 1):
Parts of the West-Indies.
Rhode-Island, July 26. This Day, 26 of the Pirates taken by his Majesty Ship the Greyhound, Captain Solgard, were executed here. Some of them delivered what they had to say in writing, and most of them said something at the Place of Execution, advising all People, young ones especially, to take warning by their unhappy Fate, and to avoid the crimes that brought them to it. Their black Flag, under which they had committed abundance of Pyracies and Murders, was affix'd to one Corner of the Gallows. It had in it the Portraiture of Death, with an Hour-Glass in one Hand, and a Dart in the other, striking into a Heart, and three Drops of Blood delineated as falling from it. This Flag they called Old Roger, and us'd to say, They would live and die under it.

Design 

Although it, most likely, was not called "Jolly Roger", usage of flag containing skull and crossbones go as early as 1588, in Basel's dance of death, Hulderich Frölich.

The first recorded uses of the skull-and-crossbones symbol on naval flags date to the 17th century.
It possibly originated among the Barbary pirates of the period, which would connect the black colour of the Jolly Roger to the Muslim Black Standard (black flag). But an early reference to Muslim corsairs flying a skull symbol, in the context of a 1625 slave raid on Cornwall, explicitly refers to the symbols being shown on a green flag.
There are mentions of Francis Drake's flying a black flag as early as 1585, but the historicity of this tradition has been called into question. Contemporary accounts show Peter Easton using a plain black flag in 1612; a plain black flag was also used by Captain Martel's pirates in 1716, Blackbeard, Charles Vane, and Richard Worley in 1718, and Howell Davis in 1719.

An early record of the skull-and-crossbones design being used on a (red) flag by pirates is found in a December 6, 1687 entry in a log book held by the Bibliothèque nationale de France. The entry describes pirates using the flag, not on a ship but on land.

17th and 18th century colonial governors usually required privateers to fly a specific version of the British flag, the 1606 Union Jack with a white crest in the middle, also distinguishing them from naval vessels. Before this time, British privateers such as Sir Henry Morgan sailed under English colours.
An early use of a black flag with skull, crossbones, and hourglass is attributed to pirate captain Emanuel Wynn in 1700, according to a wide variety of secondary sources. Reportedly, these secondary sources are based on the account of Captain John Cranby of HMS Poole and are verified at the London Public Record Office.

With the end of the War of the Spanish Succession in 1714, many privateers turned to piracy. They still used red and black flags, but now they decorated them with their own designs. Edward England, for example, flew three different flags: from his mainmast the black flag depicted above; from his foremast a red version of the same; and from his ensign staff the English national flag.
Just as variations on the Jolly Roger design existed, red flags sometimes incorporated yellow stripes or images symbolic of death. Coloured pennants and ribbons could also be used alongside flags.

Marcus Rediker (1987) claims that most pirates active between 1716 and 1726 were part of one of two large interconnected groups sharing many similarities in organisation. He states that this accounts for the "comparatively rapid adoption of the piratical black flag among a group of men operating across thousands of miles of ocean", suggesting that the skull-and-crossbone design became standardized at about the same time as the term Jolly Roger was adopted as its name. By 1730, the diversity of symbols in prior use had been mostly replaced by the standard design.

Historical designs
The gallery below showing pirate flags in use from 1693 (Thomas Tew's) to 1724 (Edward Low's) appears in multiple extant works on the history of piracy. All the secondary sources cited in the gallery below are in agreement except as to the background colour of Every's flag.

Sources exist describing the Jolly Rogers of other pirates than the ones above; also, the pirates described above sometimes used other Jolly Rogers than those shown above. However, no pictures of these alternate Jolly Rogers are easily located.

 John Phillips. At the hanging of two of John Phillips' pirates, the Boston News-Letter reported: "At one end of the gallows was their own dark flag, in the middle of which an anatomy, and at one side of it a dart in the heart, with drops of blood proceeding from it; and on the other side an hour-glass."
 Edward Low. Low used at least two other flags besides his famous red skeleton. One was "a white Skeliton in the Middle of it, with a Dart in one Hand striking bleeding Heart, and in the other, an Hour-Glass." The other was described by George Roberts, a prisoner of Low's, as a call to council among Low's ships: "a green silk flag with a yellow figure of a man blowing a trumpet on it."
 Francis Spriggs is reported to have flown a Jolly Roger identical to one of Low's, from whom he had deserted: "a white Skeliton in the Middle of it, with a Dart in one Hand striking bleeding Heart, and in the other, an Hour-Glass."
 Walter Kennedy. The Jolly Roger flag pictured above for Kennedy was flown at his ensign staff, i.e., at the stern of his ship. Kennedy also flew a jack (at the bow of the ship) and a pennant (a long narrow flag flown from the top of a mast). Both Kennedy's jack and his pennant had "only the head and cross bones".
 Florida Straits pirates. On May 2, 1822, the Massachusetts brigantine Belvidere fended off an attack by a pirate schooner in the Florida Strait. The pirates "hoisted a red flag with death's head and cross under it". Neither the pirate schooner's name nor her captain was identified by the Belvidere.
 In 1780, a pirate flag was captured in battle off the North African coast by Lt Richard Curry, who later became an admiral. The flag is red with a yellow skull and crossbones.
 In 1783, William Falconer reported that the "[t]he colours usually displayed by pirates are laid to be a black field, with a death's head, a battle-axe and hour-glass," but does not state which pirate or pirates allegedly showed this device.
 During the Eighty Years' War, the pirates who fought along with the Dutch Republic had flown the "Bloedvlag". The flag is a red with an arm holding a sword. It is flown alongside the "Prinsenvlag" and the "Statenvlag" (both flags were inspirations for the flag of the Netherlands).

Use in practice
Pirates did not fly the Jolly Roger at all times. Like other vessels, pirate ships usually stocked a variety of flags, and would normally fly a false flag or no colours until they had their prey within firing range. When the pirates' intended victim was within range, the Jolly Roger would be raised, often simultaneously with a warning shot.

The flag was probably intended as communication of the pirates' identity, which may have given target ships an opportunity to decide to surrender without a fight. For example, in June 1720, when Bartholomew Roberts sailed into the harbour at Trepassey, Newfoundland with black flags flying, the crews of all 22 vessels in the harbour abandoned their ships in panic. It is claimed (without contemporary references) that if a ship then decided to resist, the Jolly Roger was taken down and a red flag (in the 20th Century sometimes called the "Bloody Red") was flown, indicating that the pirates intended to take the ship by force and without mercy. This claim comes from only one source, in the mid-18th century Sir Richard Hawkins suggested that pirates gave quarter beneath the black flag, while no quarter was given beneath the red flag. However the cited content may simply relate to different pirate captains, their ships, their chosen flag and particular operating practices.

In view of these models, it was important for a prey ship to know that its assailant was a pirate, and not a privateer or government vessel, as the latter two generally had to abide by a rule that if a crew resisted, but then surrendered, it could not be executed:

An angry pirate therefore posed a greater danger to merchant ships than an angry Spanish coast guard or privateer vessel. Because of this, although, like pirate ships, Spanish coast guard vessels and privateers were almost always stronger than the merchant ships they attacked, merchant ships may have been more willing to attempt resisting these "legitimate" attackers than their piratical counterparts. To achieve their goal of taking prizes without a costly fight, it was therefore important for pirates to distinguish themselves from these other ships also taking prizes on the seas.

Flying a Jolly Roger was a reliable way of proving oneself a pirate. Just possessing or using a Jolly Roger was considered proof that one was a criminal pirate rather than something more legitimate; only a pirate would dare fly the Jolly Roger, as he was already under threat of execution.

Modern military use

By British submarines

Following the introduction of submarines in several navies circa 1900, Admiral Sir Arthur Wilson, the First Sea Lord of the British Royal Navy, stated that submarines were "underhanded, unfair, and damned un-English", and that he would convince the British Admiralty to have the crews of enemy submarines captured during wartime hanged as pirates.

In September 1914, the British submarine  successfully torpedoed the German cruiser SMS Hela. Remembering Wilson's statements, commanding officer Max Horton instructed his submariners to manufacture a Jolly Roger, which was flown from the submarine as she entered port. Each successful patrol saw Horton's submarine fly an additional Jolly Roger until there was no more room for flags, at which point Horton had a large Jolly Roger manufactured, onto which symbols indicating E9s achievements were sewn. A small number of other submarines adopted the practice:  flew a red flag with the skull and crossbones on return from a foray into the Dardanelles in June 1915, and the first known photograph of the practice was taken in July 1916 aboard .

The practice restarted during World War II. The flotilla leader wanted to recognise the boat's achievement, so had a Jolly Roger made and delivered to Osiris. After this, the commanders of submarine flotillas began to hand out the flags to successful submarines. Although some sources claim that all British submarines used the flag, the practice was not taken up by those submarine commanders who saw it as boastful and potentially inaccurate, as sinkings could not always be confirmed. During the war, British submarines were entitled to fly the Jolly Roger on the day of their return from a successful patrol: it would be hoisted as the boat passed the boom net, and remain raised until sunset.

Symbols on the flag indicated the history of the submarine, and it was the responsibility of the boat's personnel to keep the flag updated. The Royal Navy Submarine Museum (which, as of 2004, possessed fifteen Jolly Rogers) recognises 20 unique symbols. A bar denotes the torpedoing of a ship: red bars indicated warships, white bars represented merchant vessels, and black bars with a white "U" stood for U-boats. A dagger indicated a 'cloak and dagger' operation: typically the delivery or recovery of shore parties from enemy territory. Stars (sometimes surrounding crossed cannon) stood for occasions where the deck gun was fired. Minelaying operations were shown by the silhouette of a sea mine: a number inside the mine indicated how many such missions. A lighthouse or torch symbolised the boat's use as a navigational marker for an invasion force; the latter more particularly associated with Operation Torch. Rescue of personnel from downed aircraft or sunken ships was marked by a lifebuoy. Unique symbols are used to denote one-off incidents: for example, the Jolly Roger of  included a can-opener, referencing an incident where an Italian destroyer attempted to ram the submarine, but ended up worse off because of damage to the destroyer's hull by the submarine's hydroplanes, while  added a stork and baby when the boat's commander became a father while on patrol. Flying the Jolly Roger continued in the late 20th century and on into the 21st.  raised the flag decorated with the silhouette of a cruiser to recognise her successful attack on the Argentine cruiser ARA General Belgrano during the Falklands War. Several submarines returning from missions where Tomahawk cruise missiles were fired fly Jolly Rogers with tomahawk axes depicted, with crossed tomahawks indicating an unspecified number of firings, or individual axes for each successful launch. The Jolly Roger has been adopted as the logo of the Royal Navy Submarine Service.

By other units 

The practice, while commonly associated with British submarines, is not restricted to them. During World War II, Allied submariners working with Royal Navy fleets adopted the process from their British counterparts. While operating in the Mediterranean, the Polish submarines ORP Sokół and ORP Dzik were presented with Jolly Rogers by General Władysław Sikorski, and continued to update them during the war. At least one British surface ship recorded their U-boat kills through silhouettes on a Jolly Roger. The Australian submarine  flew the Jolly Roger in 1980, following her successful participation in the Kangaroo 3 wargame as an opposing submarine: the flag bore the silhouettes of the seven surface ships involved, as during the exercise, Onslow had successfully 'sunk' all seven.

During the Vietnam war an urgent airfield was needed at Quảng Trị by the United States forces. U.S. Seabee Battalions 1, 3, 4, 7, 11, 74, 121, and 133 all sent detachments of men and equipment to get the job done. Those detachments dubbed themselves the Ghost Battalion and chose the Jolly Roger for the Battalion's colours.

The Kuperjanov Infantry Battalion, part of the Estonian Land Forces, uses the Jolly Roger as its insignia.

Three distinct U.S. Naval Aviation squadrons have used the name and insignia of the Jolly Roger: VF-17/VF-5B/VF-61, VF-84, and VF-103, since redesignated as VFA-103. While these are distinctly different squadrons that have no lineal linkage, they all share the same Jolly Roger name, the skull and crossbones insignia and traditions.

At least twice in 2017, the USS Jimmy Carter, an American attack submarine modified to support special forces operations, returned to its home port flying a Jolly Roger. The flag was traditionally an indicative of a successful mission.

The three American destroyers named USS Kidd have all flown the Jolly Roger; they were named for US Navy Rear Admiral Isaac C. Kidd, not for William Kidd.

In popular culture

The Jolly Roger flag became a cliché of pirate fiction in the 19th century.

The "Golden Age of Piracy" was over by the mid-18th century, and piracy was widely suppressed by the 1800s, although the problem of Barbary pirates persisted until the French conquest of Algeria in 1830.

By the Victorian era, the pirate threat had receded enough for it to become a topos of boyish adventure fiction, notably influenced by Robert Louis Stevenson's adventure novel Treasure Island (1883). Gilbert and Sullivan's comic opera The Pirates of Penzance (which debuted on 31 December 1879) introduced pirates as comedic characters, and since the later 20th century, pirates sporting the Jolly Roger flag were often depicted as cartoonish or silly characters. J.M. Barrie also used it as the name of Captain Hook's pirate ship in Peter and Wendy (1904 play and 1911 novel); it was thus used in most adaptations of the character, including ABC's television series Once Upon a Time (2011-2018). Additionally, the Jolly Roger is depicted in Eiichiro Oda's manga One Piece, in which the pirate crews in the series have different designs that reflects the appearance of the captain (Straw Hat Pirates for example, the protagonist crew, having the classic skull with cross bones wearing a straw hat like the main character, Monkey D. Luffy) or a personal theme of the crew (Black Cat Pirates for example, one of the antagonist crews, having the head of a black cat with cross bones).

In films
In the film The Island (1980), the Jolly Roger is a skull with a red dot and crossbones with an hourglass on the bottom. In Disney's Pirates of the Caribbean, the Black Pearl flies a flag of skull over two crossed swords, which is not copyrighted as it is actually a copy of Calico Jack's flag, with the swords sometimes said to represent the two female pirates aboard his ship, Anne Bonny and Mary Read.

In music
Adam and the Ants' album Kings of the Wild Frontier (1980) includes the song, "Jolly Roger".

Kenny Chesney's single "Pirate Flag" is on his fourteenth studio album Life on a Rock (2013).

The cover of indie rock band Half Man Half Biscuit's 2005 album Achtung Bono shows a stylised Jolly Roger, featuring a grinning skull adorned with sunglasses and a halo.

The cover of Iron Maiden's album A Matter of Life and Death (2006) includes a version of a Jolly Roger depicting a helmeted Eddie and two assault rifles instead of bones, hanging from a tank.

On the cover of Michael Jackson's album Dangerous (1991), the Jolly Roger can be seen on the left side with the alteration of a skull over two swords.

The re-issued version of the Megadeth album, Killing Is My Business... and Business Is Good! (1985), shows a stylized Vic Rattlehead skull on top of crossed swords and crossed bones. This was based on Mustaine's original drawing for the cover which the band did not have enough money to produce at the time.

The "pirate" German metal band Running Wild often references the Jolly Roger and other pirate related themes in their music. Their third album is named Under Jolly Roger.

Another "pirate" metal band Alestorm also uses Jolly Roger and other pirate related themes in their music.

The Pirates, a spinoff of the band Johnny Kidd & the Pirates, released an album called Out of their Skulls featuring a skull with crossed guitars below it.

British DJ Eddie Richards released the acid house hit "Acid Man" in 1988, under a Jolly Roger alias.

In sports

A number of sports teams have been known to use variations of the Jolly Roger.

One of the best known in current use is the National Football League's Tampa Bay Buccaneers' adaptation of Calico Jack's pirate flag, with a carnelian red background instead of black, and an American football positioned over the intersection of two crossed swords.

The supporters of FC St. Pauli, a sports club from Hamburg, Germany best known for its association football team, have adopted a variation of Richard Worley's flag as their own unofficial emblem.

The Jolly Roger is the popular icon of all University College Cork (Ireland) sports teams.

"Raise the Jolly Roger!" is used in a statement by the Major League Baseball's team Pittsburgh Pirates announcer Greg Brown when the Pirates win a game. Brown has become known for the phrase, his signature call, similar to other sports broadcasters, such as the Cincinnati Reds' announcer Marty Brennamen's phrase ('This one belongs to the Reds'), and former Pirates announcers Lanny Frattare ("There was no doubt about it!") and Bob Prince, who liked to end Pirates wins with similarly jovial statements.

Another such variation is the Las Vegas Raiders', which depicts a head with facial features, wearing an eye patch and a helmet, and crossed swords behind the helmet.

All these variations are seen as the logos of sporting teams in (Scotland):
 The Braehead Paisley Pirates/Paisley Pirates of the Scottish National League and The Paisley Buccaneers and Riversdale Pirates of the Scottish Recreational Ice Hockey Conference
 The East Kilbride Pirates American football team in BAFA Division 1
 The Edinburgh Buccaneers basketball club of the Scottish Men's National League

The South African Football Association soccer team Orlando Pirates also has the classic Jolly Roger as their logo. Central Coast United FC in Australia use the Jolly Roger in their club crest and their active supporters are known as the Graveyard.

The athletic teams of East Carolina University used a stylized Jolly Roger as one of their logos. This particular variation includes an earringed and eyepatch-wearing skull donning a tricorn of purple and gold (the school's colours) emblazoned over two crossbones. This logo appears on the helmets of the school's football team, and an elaborate pre-game ritual takes place prior to each home contest wherein a flag bearing the university's Jolly Roger logo is raised on a special flagpole located behind the west end zone prior to the opening kickoff. Immediately prior to the start of the fourth quarter, the normal (black) Jolly Roger is lowered and replaced with a flag bearing the ECU Jolly Roger on a red background, indicating that the Pirates will grant their opponents "no quarter".

The Blackshirts, the starting defensive unit players for the Nebraska Cornhuskers football team, are represented by a Jolly Roger, somewhat similar to Richard Worley's flag but with the skull encased in the team's football helmet. Additionally, the players and fans often celebrate by "throwing the bones", where they cross the forearms in front of the chest in an 'X' imitating the logo, and the student section at Memorial Stadium, Lincoln is known as the 'Boneyard', where the logo is often displayed on banners, signs, and flags in an act of intimidation.

When Viktor Korchnoi opposed Anatoly Karpov for the World Chess Championship 1978, he was a defector from the Soviet Union and momentarily stateless; so he played with a miniature Jolly Roger at the chess table.

Other uses
 
The early development team of the Apple Macintosh used a pirate flag to portray a "rebellious" spirit.

Before changing to a stylized "P", Sweden's Pirate Party used the Jolly Roger as its symbol, which is still used extensively in the Pirate movement. The Piratbyrån and its online database, The Pirate Bay also use either the skull and crossbones symbol, or derivatives of it, such as the logo of Home Taping Is Killing Music.

The flag of the Sea Shepherd Conservation Society is modelled to look like a classic Jolly Roger, with some alterations. The flag depicts a whale and a dolphin on the skull's forehead, and the crossed long-bones are replaced with a crossed trident and a shepherd's crook.

Ozlock Con, a conference about physical security, uses a logo inspired by the Jolly Roger. The skull is a lock and the bones are lockpicks.

See also 
 Ossuary
 Anarchist flag
 Black Standard
 Flag of Blackbeard
 Flag of the Netherlands
 Maritime flag
 Raven banner
 Totenkopf
 VF-61, VF-84 and VF-103, US Navy fighter squadrons nicknamed "Jolly Rogers"
 Pesthörnchen (CCC)

References

Explanatory notes

Citations

Bibliography

Books

Journal and news articles

Websites

External links 

Cross symbols
Maritime flags
Pictograms
Pirate customs and traditions
Skulls in art
Memento mori